Moore House or Moore Farm may refer to:

Canada 
John Moore House (Sparta, Ontario)

United States

Alabama 
Drewry-Mitchell-Moorer House, Eufaula

Arkansas 
Dickinson-Moore House, Arkansas City
Smith-Moore House, Beebe
Moore House (Canehill, Arkansas)
Moore-Jacobs House, Clarendon
Moore-Hornor House, Helena
W. H. Moore House, Hot Springs
Moore House (Little Rock, Arkansas)
Moore House (Searcy, Arkansas)

California 
Moore House (Long Beach, California), listed on the Long Beach historic landmarks
Moore House (Ojai, California)
James Moore House (Woodland, California), listed on the National Register of Historic Places (NRHP) in Yolo County, California

Connecticut 
William Moore Jr. House, Barkhamsted
Roswell Moore II House, Southington
Deacon John Moore House, Windsor
Edward and Ann Moore House, Windsor

Delaware 
Moore Potato House, Laurel
Moore House (Smyrna, Delaware)

Georgia 
Tarleton Moore House, Acworth, listed on the NRHP in Cobb County, Georgia
Pritchard-Moore-Goodrich House, Griffin
Williams-Moore-Hillsman House, Roberta

Idaho 
Moore-Cunningham House, Boise
Jim Moore Place, Dixie

Illinois 
C. H. Moore House, Clinton
Nathan G. Moore House, Oak Park

Indiana 
Thomas Moore House (Indianapolis, Indiana)
Moore-Youse-Maxon House, Muncie

Iowa 
Josiah B. and Sara Moore House, Villisca

Kentucky 
Christopher Collins Moore Farm, Danville, listed on the NRHP in Boyle County, Kentucky
Maria Moore House, Bowling Green, listed on the NRHP in Warren County, Kentucky
Simeon Moore House, Fisherville
John Moore House (Francisville, Kentucky), listed on the NRHP in Boone County, Kentucky
Randolph Gilbert Moore House, Franklin, listed on the NRHP in Simpson County, Kentucky
Parke-Moore House, Lancaster, listed on the NRHP in Garrard County, Kentucky
Rev. William Dudley Moore House, Lawrenceburg
Moore-Redd-Frazer House, Lexington, listed on the NRHP in Fayette County, Kentucky
J. J. Moore House, Parksville, listed on the NRHP in Boyle County, Kentucky
George F. Moore Place, Versailles, listed on the NRHP in Woodford County, Kentucky

Louisiana 
R. T. Moore House, Bernice
Moore House (Mandeville, Louisiana), listed on the NRHP in St. Tammany Parish, Louisiana

Maine 
Moore-Mayo House, Bass Harbor
John Moore House (Edgecomb, Maine)
Henry D. Moore Parish House and Library, Steuben

Massachusetts 
Moore-Hill House, Peabody
Moore House (Winchester, Massachusetts)
Jesse Moore House, Worcester

Michigan 
Charles H. Moore–Albert E. Sleeper House, Lexington

Minnesota 
George M. Moore Farmstead, Jackson, listed on the NRHP in Minnesota

Mississippi 
Noah Moore House, Enterprise, listed on the NRHP in Clarke County, Mississippi
House on Ellicott's Hill, Natchez

Missouri 
Moore House (Charleston, Missouri)
J. Herbert Moore House, Poplar Bluff
Moore-Dalton House, Poplar Bluff
Thomas Moore House (Poplar Bluff, Missouri)

New Hampshire 
Moore Farm and Twitchell Mill Site, Dublin

New Mexico 
Moore-Ward Cobblestone House, Artesia

New York 
Moore House (Garrison, New York)
Benjamin C. Moore Mill, Lockport
D. D. T. Moore Farmhouse, Loudonville
Benjamin Moore Estate, Muttontown
Moore-McMillen House, New York
William H. Moore House, New York
Moore House (Poughkeepsie, New York)
J. W. Moore House, Rhinebeck
Silas B. Moore Gristmill, Ticonderoga

North Carolina 
Andrews-Moore House, Bunn
Moore-Holt-White House, Burlington
Robert Joseph Moore House, Bynum
Alexander Moore Farm, Catawba
Walter R. and Eliza Smith Moore House, Clayton
Matthew Moore House, Danbury
Susan J. Armistead Moore House, Edenton
Eli Moore House, High Point
Arthur W. Moore House, Horse Shoe
Moore House (Locust Hill, North Carolina)
William Alfred Moore House, Mount Airy
Moore-Manning House, Pittsboro
John Covington Moore House, Tusquitee
Walter E. Moore House, Webster

Ohio 
Leonard M. Moore House, Lorain, listed on the NRHP in Lorain County, Ohio
Edward W. and Louise C. Moore Estate, Mentor, listed on the NRHP in Lake County, Ohio
Philip Moore Stone House, West Portsmouth
Charles H. Moore House, Wyoming

Oklahoma 
Moore-Lindsay House, Norman
Moore Manor, Tulsa, listed on the NRHP in Tulsa County, Oklahoma
Moore-Settle House, Wynnewood, listed on the NRHP in Garvin County, Oklahoma

Oregon 
Robert D. Moore House, Bend
John and Mary Moore House, Brownsville, listed on the NRHP in Linn County, Oregon
John and Helen Moore House, Moro

Pennsylvania 
Capt. Thomas Moore House, Philadelphia
Clarence B. Moore House, Philadelphia
Moore Hall (Phoenixville, Pennsylvania)
Knipe-Moore-Rupp Farm, Upper Gwynedd Township

South Carolina 
Moore-Mann House, Columbia
Moore-Kinard House, Ninety Six

Tennessee 
Moore Family Farm, Bulls Gap
Hunt-Moore House, Huntland

Texas 
Moore-Hancock Farmstead, Austin, listed on the NRHP in Travis County, Texas
Moore House (Bryan, Texas), listed on the NRHP in Brazos County, Texas
Dixon-Moore House, Dallas, Texas, listed on the NRHP in Dallas County, Texas
Moore House (Ennis, Texas), listed on the NRHP in Ellis County, Texas
Morris-Moore House, Paris, Texas, listed on the NRHP in Lamar County, Texas
John M. and Lottie D. Moore House, Richmond
Draughon-Moore House, Texarkana
Col. Hugh B. and Helen Moore House, Texas City, listed on the NRHP in Galveston County, Texas
W. B. Moore House, Waxahachie, listed on the NRHP in Ellis County, Texas
Moran-Moore House, Wharton, listed on the NRHP in Wharton County, Texas

Virginia 
Fairfax-Moore House, Alexandria
Capt. James Moore Homestead, Boissevain
John Moore House (Lexington, Virginia)
J. W. R. Moore House, Mount Jackson
Moore House (Yorktown, Virginia)

Washington 
James Moore House (Pasco, Washington), listed on the NRHP in Franklin County, Washington
Miles C. Moore House, Walla Walla, listed on the NRHP in Walla Walla County, Washington
Edward B. Moore House, Yakima, listed on the NRHP in Yakima County, Washington

West Virginia 
Elizabeth Moore Hall, Morgantown

Wisconsin 
Dr. Volney L. Moore House, Waukesha, listed on the NRHP in Waukesha County, Wisconsin

See also
James Moore House (disambiguation)
John Moore House (disambiguation)
Moorehouse, a surname
Moor House, London